Black Elk Peak is the highest natural point in the U.S. state of South Dakota and the Midwestern United States. It lies in the Black Elk Wilderness area, in southern Pennington County, in the Black Hills National Forest. At , it is the highest summit in the United States east of the Rocky Mountains. Though part of the North American Cordillera, it is generally considered to be geologically separate from the Rocky Mountains. 

It is also known as Hiŋháŋ Káǧa ('owl-maker' in Lakota) and Heȟáka Sápa ('elk black').

The U.S. Board on Geographic Names, which has jurisdiction in federal lands, officially changed the mountain's name from Harney Peak to Black Elk Peak on August 11, 2016, honoring Black Elk, the noted Lakota Sioux medicine man for whom the Wilderness Area is named.

In September 2016, a team of professional surveyors obtained precise GNSS data over the course of two days and found the highest natural rock to be at  NAVD88 and a nearby secondary peak located approximately 300 feet south of the lookout tower and unofficially named "McGillicuddy's Peak", to be slightly lower at  NAVD88. This is believed to be the only precise survey that has been made to determine the true elevation of this peak.

The peak's fire lookout tower and the staircase leading to it, as well as a nearby dam and pumphouse, were listed on the National Register of Historic Places in 1983.

Hiŋháŋ Káǧa
This peak was called Hiŋháŋ Káǧa, or, "Owl maker," after rock formations that look like owls (and the association of owls with impending death by the Lakota Sioux). They dominated this region and occupied the territory at the time of European colonization. They considered it a sacred site within the Black Hills, which they call Pahá Sápa and Ȟé Sápa.

The mountain was named Harney Peak in 1855 by American Lieutenant Gouverneur K. Warren in honor of US General William S. Harney, his commander in a regional military expedition. In punitive retaliation for other Sioux raids, in September 1855 Harney's forces killed Brulé Sioux warriors, women and children in what Americans called the Battle of Blue Water Creek in Garden County, Nebraska.

Harney later commanded the United States military in the Black Hills area in the late 1870s. 
The Lakota had tried to get the name of the peak changed for 50 years, as Harney had massacred their people.

In 2014 the Sioux renewed their effort to get the name changed, in an effort led by Basil Brave Heart of the Pine Ridge Indian Reservation. A Korean War veteran, he felt that Harney had not honored the military with his action.

Some Lakota requested state officials in 2015 to reinstate their original name Hinhan Kaga for the peak. The Lakota Council of the Pine Ridge Reservation and descendants of Black Elk, a noted medicine man, supported naming it for him, as the national wilderness area around the peak is named for the shaman.

He became known beyond the Lakota in part through the book Black Elk Speaks (1932), written by John G. Neihardt from long talks with the shaman. South Dakota Governor Dennis Daugaard opposed the name change, as did other state officials, and no action was taken in 2015.

The U.S. Board on Geographic Names officially changed the mountain's name from "Harney Peak" to "Black Elk Peak" on August 11, 2016, by a unanimous vote of 12–0, with one abstention. On August 18, 2016, Gov. Daugaard announced that the state would accept the new name.

History

Black Elk Peak and the Black Hills were protected within the Great Sioux Reservation established by the United States government in the Treaty of Fort Laramie in 1868; it covered most of the territory west of the Missouri River in South Dakota (the area now called West River). American settlement was concentrated east of the river, where there was more water for farming.

The first Americans believed to have reached the summit were a party led by General George Armstrong Custer in 1874, during the Black Hills expedition. The federal government took back the Black Hills and another strip of land in a new treaty in 1877. More than a decade later, it broke up the Great Sioux Reservation in 1889 into five smaller reservations, the same year that North Dakota and South Dakota were admitted as states to the Union. The government made some nine million acres of former Lakota land available for purchase for ranching and homesteading. Most American settlement in West River did not start until the early 20th century. The area attracted many European immigrants as well as migrants from the East.

Black Elk Peak is the site where Black Elk (Lakota Sioux) received his "Great Vision" when nine years old. He later became a medicine man known for his wisdom. Late in life, he returned to the peak accompanied by writer John Neihardt. Black Elk was sharing much of his life and philosophy with Neihardt through long talks translated by his son. Neihardt tried to express the medicine man's wisdom in his book Black Elk Speaks (1932).

Neihardt recorded Black Elk's words about his vision as follows:

"I was standing on the highest mountain of them all, and round about beneath me was the whole hoop of the world," he is quoted as saying. "And while I stood there I saw more than I can tell and I understood more than I saw; for I was seeing in a sacred manner the shapes of all things in the spirit, and the shape of all shapes as they must live together like one being."

New York mining promoter James Wilson organized the Harney Peak Tin Company around 1884 or 1885. The Harney Peak Tin Company did not actually mine any tin, and was liquidated by court order in the 1890s, losing investors almost $3 million (equivalent to approximately $ million in ) in the largest fraud scandal in Black Hills mining history.

American settlers used Black Elk Peak as a fire lookout tower in 1911, with a wood crate placed at the summit for a seat. In 1920, a 12'x12' wood structure was built, and it was expanded to 16'x16' the following year.  The federal Civilian Conservation Corps enlisted local men and completed construction of a stone fire tower in 1938, one of numerous projects in the state during the Great Depression. The Harney Peak fire tower was last staffed in 1967.

A United States post office was operated at Black Elk Peak from 1936 until 1942, and again from 1945 until 1946. The Harney Peak post office was reportedly one of the "most elevated post offices in the United States".

A manmade dam was also created on the peak in 1935. This concrete reservoir holds  of water; a pumphouse was added in 1938. In 1982, the lookout tower and its stairway, dam, and pumphouse were nominated by the USDA Forest Service for inclusion in the National Register of Historic Places. The Forest Service cited the site's cultural, recreational, and architectural significance to South Dakota. On March 10, 1983, the site was officially added to the register.

In May 2015 the South Dakota Board of Geographic Names recommended renaming Harney Peak as Hinhan Kaga, to remove the name of a commander known for massacring Sioux women and children at the Battle of Blue Water Creek  and to honor the original Lakota name for the mountain. At the end of the following month, the board reversed the recommendation that the peak be renamed saying that "there was no public consensus on a new name." The Lakota were divided on a preferred name, and Republican Governor Dennis Daugaard and some other Americans opposed any name change.

The recommendation for renaming went to the federal US Board on Geographic Names. The federal board acknowledged that the name was of concern to the Lakota, and its spokesman said, "In this case, the board felt that the name was derogatory or offensive, being that it was on a holy site of the Native Americans." In a decision published August 11, 2016, the United States Board on Geographic Names adopted the name "Black Elk Peak."

Hiking

The summit can be reached from Sylvan Lake, Camp Remington, Highway 244, Palmer Creek Rd., Mount Rushmore, or Horse Thief Lake. This is the shortest, least strenuous, and most popular route. No permit is required for use of the trail. However, A South Dakota State Parks pass is required to access the Sylvan Lake trailhead.

An old stone tower, once used as a fire lookout tower, is located at the summit. The ashes of Valentine McGillycuddy were interred near the base of the tower and a plaque reads, "Valentine McGillycuddy, Wasicu Wakan." Wasicu Wakan is Lakota for "Holy White Man."

Gallery

See also

 List of U.S. states by elevation
 List of mountains in South Dakota

Notes

References

External links

 
 

Mountains of South Dakota
Black Hills
Religious places of the indigenous peoples of North America
Landforms of Pennington County, South Dakota
Sacred mountains
Highest points of U.S. states
Black Hills National Forest
North American 2000 m summits
National Register of Historic Places in Pennington County, South Dakota
Buildings and structures completed in 1938
Dams on the National Register of Historic Places in South Dakota
Fire lookout towers on the National Register of Historic Places
Civilian Conservation Corps in South Dakota
Dams completed in 1935